Pablo Ariel Tabachnik (born November 20, 1977 in San Juan, Argentina) is an Argentinian table tennis player.  He competed in the 2004 Summer Olympics with Oscar Gonzalez. He is a three-time Olympian (2000, 2004, and 2008).

See also
List of select Jewish table tennis players

References

External links
 
 

1977 births
Living people
Argentine male table tennis players
Pan American Games medalists in table tennis
Jewish table tennis players
Argentine Jews
Jewish Argentine sportspeople
Olympic table tennis players of Argentina
Table tennis players at the 2000 Summer Olympics
Table tennis players at the 2004 Summer Olympics
Table tennis players at the 2007 Pan American Games
Table tennis players at the 2008 Summer Olympics
Table tennis players at the 2011 Pan American Games
Pan American Games silver medalists for Argentina
People from San Juan, Argentina
Table tennis players at the 2015 Pan American Games
South American Games silver medalists for Argentina
South American Games bronze medalists for Argentina
South American Games medalists in table tennis
Competitors at the 2006 South American Games
Table tennis players at the 2019 Pan American Games
Medalists at the 2007 Pan American Games
Medalists at the 2011 Pan American Games
Medalists at the 2019 Pan American Games
Sportspeople from San Juan Province, Argentina